Broken Bow is a city in McCurtain County, Oklahoma, United States. The population was 4,120 at the 2010 census. It is named after Broken Bow, Nebraska, the former hometown of the city's founders, the Dierks brothers.  Other Dierks-associated legacies in town include Dierks Elementary School, Dierks Street, and Dierks Train #227 which is preserved in Broken Bow.

History
The land that would become Broken Bow was owned by the Choctaw tribe prior to being settled by colonizers. Growing around a lumber company started by two brothers, Broken Bow had a population of 1,983, just a decade after its incorporation in 1911. The city lies within the Little Dixie region of Oklahoma, an area originally settled largely by Southerners seeking a new start following the American Civil War.

The city was the location of the wounding and capture of murderer Richard Wayne Snell in 1984, following his shootout with local police. Snell had shot and killed two men in Arkansas, a pawn shop owner and Arkansas State Trooper Louis P. Bryant.

At the time of its founding, Broken Bow was located in Bok Tuklo County of the Apukshunubbee District, one of three administrative super-regions of the Choctaw Nation.

Geography
Broken Bow is located at  (34.029784, −94.737656).

Broken Bow is served by US Route 70, US Route 259, and Oklahoma State Highway 3.  Intercity bus service is available from Jefferson Lines in De Queen, Arkansas, about 24 miles east.

The city of Broken Bow stands in a unique transition zone between the Red River basin and the Ouachita Mountains. While the Ouachita Mountains are sandstone ridges that are considered the roughest land in Oklahoma, the Red River basin is considered fertile. North of Broken Bow is Broken Bow Lake, created by the United States Army Corps of Engineers by damming the Mountain Fork River. The lake's creation forced Hochatown to relocate to its present-day location.

The lake contains small islands, bass and is surrounded by pine trees.

The city sits at the foothills of the Kiamichi Mountains, a subrange of the Ouachita Mountains. the Kiamichi Mountains sit within Le Flore, Pushmataha, and McCurtain counties near the towns of Poteau and Albion. The Kiamichi peaks line up south of the Kiamichi River and reach  in elevation. The range is the namesake of Kiamichi Country, the official tourism designation for southeastern Oklahoma.

Black bear, coyote, bobcat, deer, minks, bats, bald eagles, and varieties of woodpeckers, doves, owls, and road runners are native to the Kiamichi Mountains region.

Climate

Economy
In recent years, Broken Bow has seen a tremendous economic boom through the development of its timber and tourism industries. The town is also home to a chicken-processing plant owned by Tyson Industries.

Tourism

In addition to being home of Broken Bow Lake, the city is a gateway for tourists visiting Beavers Bend Resort Park, Hochatown State Park, and Cedar Creek Golf Course at Beavers Bend. Hunters also visit the region, which bills itself as the "deer capital of the world."

Broken Bow is home to two museums containing Native American artifacts. The Gardner Mansion and Museum was the historic home of the "Chief of the Choctaws" and was built in 1884. The Indian Memorial Museum houses pre-historic Indian pottery, fossils, Quartz crystal and antique glass.

Timber
The forest industry is by far the area's largest business concern. The Oklahoma State Department of Agriculture Forestry Division and United States Forest Service have a large presence in the area and are constantly surveying the area forests in order to prevent wildfires.

Weyerhaeuser Company operates a large plant in nearby Idabel, and International Paper also operates a large mill in Valliant. Additionally, Weyerhaeuser maintains several pine tree plantations throughout McCurtain County. Pan Pacific operates a fiberboard plant on the west side of Broken Bow. Huber Engineered Woods is the latest big player to enter the area, with a very large oriented strand board (OSB) plant, also on the west side of Broken Bow. Huber plans to employ about 160 people at the site and expects to create another 250 jobs within the local community.

Athletics 

While Broken Bow's athletic history is limited primarily to high school football, it is recognized as one of the top high school programs in the state of Oklahoma. The Broken Bow Savages currently hold four state football championships, ranking third in class AAAA in the state, behind the Clinton Red Tornadoes (14) and the Ada Cougars (19). In addition to their four state championships, the Savages have numerous state title game appearances, the most recent of which came in 2004 when the Savages lost to Clinton. The team's last real push for the OSSAA State Championship game was when the 2008 Savage football team lost to the Glenpool Warriors in a nail-biter 12–7 in the state semi-finals. Which ended their season with a record of 12–1. Broken Bow High School integrated in 1964. LeVell Hill and Larry Taylor were the first Black athletes to play for Broken Bow High School.  They promptly led Broken Bow to its first appearance in a football state championship game.  Broken Bow lost to the Clinton Red Tornadors in 1965. LeVell Hill and Larry Taylor led Broken Bow to Its first State Track Championship in 1966. Larry Taylor entered the United States Marine Corp after graduation. He was killed in Viet Nam in 1968.  LeVell Hill accepted a football scholarship to Langston University.  He briefly played for the Philadelphia Bell in the World Football League.

The Savages own a distinct lead in their all-time series with their rival, the Idabel Warriors. The Little River Rumble (named for the river that flows between Broken Bow and Idabel) is played every year between these two schools and is one of the oldest rivalries in the state, dating back nearly an entire century. For some time, it was believed the Little River Rumble was the oldest continuous-running rivalry game in the state of Oklahoma, until it was discovered the two schools did not play each other one season during World War II. The rivalry is hotly contested, and it's not an uncommon sight to see students from either town besieging the other, flying the flag of their school (black and gold for the Savages, red and black for the Warriors). A gold traveling trophy, as well as bragging rights, is at stake every year when the two McCurtain County schools tangle. Currently, the Warriors have won the last two match-ups (as of September 2015), following a fourteen-game winning streak from the Savages.

Broken Bow Memorial Stadium|Historic Broken Bow Memorial Stadium has served as the home of the Savages since it was constructed in the 1930s by the Works Progress Administration. Built primarily of concrete and native rock, Memorial Stadium is one of the oldest and largest high school football stadiums in the state of Oklahoma.

Band
For the past ten years, Broken Bow High School Band has received Superior Rating at the McAlester Regional Marching Contest and have placed in class 4A in every marching competition that they competed in this past season. The Band was originally known as the "Savage Pride" before it was changed in 2006 to the "Black and Gold Regiment."

Demographics

As of the census of 2010, there were 4,120 people, 1,599 households, and 1,036 families residing in the city. The population density was 824 people per square mile (317/km2). There were 1,793 housing units at an average density of 359.6 per square mile (137.9/km2). The racial makeup of the city was 61.80% White, 8.30% African American, 18.50% Native American, 0.60% Asian, 0.00% Pacific Islander, 3.90% from other races, and 6.80% from two or more races. Hispanic or Latino of any race were 5.32% of the population.

There were 1,599 households, out of which 31.5% had children under the age of 18 living with them, 35.8% were married couples living together, 23.2% had a female householder with no husband present, and 35.2% were non-families. 32.5% of all households were made up of individuals, and 15.0% had someone living alone who was 65 years of age or older. The average household size was 2.51, and the average family size was 3.17.

In the city, the population was spread out, with 29.9% under the age of 18, 51.2% from 19–65, and 15.9% who were 65 years of age or older. The median age was 35.3 years. Males made up 46.2% of the population, while Females made up 53.8%.

The median income for a household in the city was $19,350, and the median income for a family was $22,500. Males had a median income of $32,2608 versus $20,895 for females. The per capita income for the city was $14,381. About 36.6% of families and 46.9% of the population were below the poverty line, including 46.9% of those under age 18 and 31.8% of those age 65 or over.

Notable people
 Harry Brecheen, former MLB pitcher for the St. Louis Cardinals
 James Butler, former sprinter, NCAA champion and 200 m winner at the Liberty Bell Classic
 Gail Davies, singer/songwriter with several top-10 country hits to her name.
 Randy Rutherford, former basketball player, most notable for his time as a college player for Oklahoma State

Popular media
In 1951, author Snowden Miller published 'Gene Autry And The Badmen Of Broken Bow', featuring the famous Western film star of that name.

In "Broken Bow", the 2001 pilot episode of the television series Star Trek: Enterprise, Broken Bow was the site of Human-Klingon first contact in 2151. A messenger named Klaang was shot down by the Suliban over a corn field. Shortly after dispatching his enemies, Klaang was shot by a farmer named Moore. Although severely injured, Klaang survived.

Broken Bow and the surrounding area also served as the location for the episode "19:19" of the television series Millennium, in which Frank Black led a search for a group of children who had been abducted on their way to school.  The abductor, a crazed visionary who believed he was the one destined to carry out the Book of Revelation's instructions, entombed the children in an abandoned quarry.  This ultimately saved them from a deadly tornado that destroyed the schoolhouse where they otherwise would have been.

Broken Bow is a location in the 2010 film Leaves of Grass.

References

External links
 Broken Bow Chamber of Commerce
 Broken Bow information, photos and videos on TravelOK.com Official travel and tourism website for the State of Oklahoma
 Broken Bow Public Schools
 Broken Bow Public Library
 Oklahoma Historical Society - Broken Bow

Cities in McCurtain County, Oklahoma
Cities in Oklahoma
Star Trek locations
Cities in the Ark-La-Tex